Dactylinius punctipennis is a species of beetles in the family Carabidae, the only species in the genus Dactylinius.

References

Pterostichinae
Monotypic Carabidae genera